KVSV-FM is an adult standards formatted broadcast radio station licensed to Beloit, Kansas, serving North-Central Kansas.  Prior to January 1, 2016, KVSV-FM had been programmed as an easy listening/beautiful music format station.  KVSV-FM is owned and operated by McGrath Publishing Company.

References

External links
KVSV Radio FM105.5 Online

1980 establishments in Kansas
Easy listening radio stations
Radio stations established in 1980
VSV-FM